Pleustidae is a family of amphipods belonging to the order Amphipoda.

Genera

The family contains 36 genera in 12 subfamilies:

  Subfamily Atylopsinae 
Atylopsis 
Myzotarsa 
 Subfamily Austropleustinae 
Austropleustes 
Tepidopleustes 
 Subfamily Dactylopleustinae 
Dactylopleustes 
 Subfamily Eosymtinae 
Cognateosymtes 
Eosymtes 
 Subfamily Mesopleustinae 
Mesopleustes 
 Subfamily Neopleustinae 
Hendrycksopleustes 
Neopleustes 
Pleustostenus 
Shoemakeroides 
 Subfamily Parapleustinae 
Chromopleustes 
Commensipleustes 
Gnathopleustes 
Incisocalliope 
Micropleustes 
Parapleustes 
Trachypleustes 
 Subfamily Pleusirinae 
Pleusirus 
 Subfamily Pleustinae 
Pleustes 
Thorlaksonius 
 Subfamily Pleustoidinae 
Pleustoides 
 Subfamily Pleusymtinae 
Anomalosymtes 
Budnikopleustes 
Heteropleustes 
Holopleustes 
Kamptopleustes 
Pleustomesus 
Pleusymtes 
Rhinopleustes 
Vinogradovopleustes 
 Subfamily Stenopleustinae 
Arctopleustes 
Domicola 
Gracilipleustes 
Stenopleustes

References

Amphipoda